WLXZ (90.3 FM) is a radio station broadcasting a Religious format. Licensed to Pinehurst, North Carolina, United States, the station is currently owned by Educational Media Foundation (EMF), and broadcasts EMF's K-Love contemporary Christian programming.

The station was first licensed in 2002, and held the call sign WBFY. It was owned by the American Family Association and was an affiliate of American Family Radio. In 2016, the station was traded to Educational Media Foundation, and it became an affiliate of K-Love. On July 15, 2016, its call sign was changed to WLXZ.

References

External links
 
 

Radio stations established in 2002
2002 establishments in North Carolina
Educational Media Foundation radio stations
K-Love radio stations
LXZ